Erentxun is a town located in the municipality of Iruraiz-Gauna, in the province of Álava (Araba), in the autonomous community of Basque Country, northern Spain.

References

External links
 Erentxun in the web of its municipality.
 ERENCHUN in the Bernardo Estornés Lasa - Auñamendi Encyclopedia (Euskomedia Fundazioa) 

Towns in Álava